Cascadia is an unincorporated community and census-designated place (CDP) that was established in 1892 on the South Santiam River,  east of the current city of Sweet Home, in Linn County, Oregon, United States. As of the 2010 census it had a population of 147.

Originally a stage stop on the Santiam Wagon Road, then a summer resort also known as Cascadia Mineral Springs, Cascadia had a post office established in 1898. It maintains a ZIP code of 97329. The resort had a hotel established by George Geisendorfer, who was also the first postmaster. People were attracted to Cascadia because of its mineral spring water. The property was sold to the state in 1940 and now is the site of the  Cascadia State Park.

Demographics

Climate
This region experiences warm (but not hot) and dry summers, with no average monthly temperatures above  According to the Köppen Climate Classification system, Cascadia has a warm-summer Mediterranean climate, abbreviated "Csb" on climate maps.

Transportation

See also
Cascadia State Park
List of ghost towns in Oregon

References

External links 
Historic Images of Cascadia from Salem Public Library
Cascadia State Park Brochure with History

Unincorporated communities in Linn County, Oregon
Spa towns in Oregon
Census-designated places in Oregon
1892 establishments in Oregon
Populated places established in 1892
Unincorporated communities in Oregon